Triton Digital, LLC, formerly Triton Media Group, is a digital audio technology and advertising company based in Los Angeles.
The group was formally owned by E. W. Scripps Company which sold Triton to IHeartMedia in October 2020. The company works with audio publishers in over 35 countries including brands such as Pandora, Spotify, iHeartRadio, AccuRadio, CBS Radio, and ESPN Radio.

Company
Triton Digital was founded in August 2006 by Neal Schore and Mike Agovino in Sherman Oaks, California, in the Los Angeles area.
It was funded as a limited partnership by private investors.

Digital
Triton announced a partnership to resell Slipstream Radio in 2008.
Triton Digital acquired Ando Media in September 2009.
Ando Media was founded in 2004 in Denver, Colorado.
Ando developed software to audience measurement metrics for Internet radio, competing with the major firm Arbitron by 2006.
In 2011 Ernst & Young named Schore (chief executive of Triton Media at the time) entrepreneur of the year for Los Angeles area advertising companies.
In April 2011, the Media Rating Council accredited Triton's Webcast Metrics product.
In January 2013 Triton Digital pioneered the first programmatic audio ad exchange (named a2x.) In 2015 Triton Digital was acquired by Vector Capital. In October 2016, Triton launched Yield-Op, an in-house built SSP (Supply Side Platform) to power its ad exchange.

Acquisitions

Ando Media
In September 2009, Triton Media Group acquired Ando Media, a company which developed products for internet radio and the content delivery industry that assisted stations in monetizing their audience. These products include Webcast Metrics (audience measurement), Ad Injector (ad injection prior to or into a stream including impression measurement), and PodLoc (creates podcasts of any audio on the fly and make available for download as well as measurement). Ando Media had been formed in 2004 by a software company, Ando Media, Inc. and Aritaur Communications, Inc. an owner of radio stations and Internet related ventures.

E. W. Scripps Company
On October 17, 2018, the E. W. Scripps Company announced its intention to acquire Triton Digital for $150 million in cash. If approved, the sale is expected to close by the end of 2018. Scripps will continue to run Triton as a separate entity.

iHeartMedia
On February 17, 2021, iHeartMedia announced that it has entered into an agreement with The E. W. Scripps Company to acquire Triton Digital for $230 million.

Integrations 
In May 2019, TouchPoint DSP by dataxu integrated Triton Digital inventory.

Publishers 
In December 2018, Triton did a partnership with Deezer, distributing audio ads programmatic across 20 countries worldwide.

In April 2019, Stingray taped Triton for audio monetisation.

In November 2019, BFM (Malaysia) partners with Triton Digital for audio monetization.

References

Oaktree Capital Management media holdings
E. W. Scripps Company